José Antonio Expósito Piñero (born 2 May 1978 in Águilas, Murcia) is a Paralympic athlete from Spain.

Personal 
Expósito was born in 1978. He has an intellectual disability. In 2013, he was awarded the gold Real Orden al Mérito Deportivo. In November 2013, he attended the Gala Sports Columbine, which was held in the Auditorium and Congress Palace Infanta Doña Elena, and where he received a standing ovation.

Athletics 
Antonio competes in T20 (track) and F20 (field) events. He has held the T20 Long Jump world record since 2005. He competed at the 2008 INAS World Indoor Athletics Championships held in Tallinn, Estonia, earning gold in the 60 meters and long jump, and picking up a bronze in the 4x400 meter event. He won the 2010 European championships in the 100 meters and long jump events.

Expósito competed in 2010 INAS European Athletics Championship and picked up a pair of gold medals in the long jump and 100 meter events. He qualified for and competed in the 2011 IPC Athletics World Championships where he was one of thirty-two competitors representing Spain. He competed in the 2011 INAS World Games, winning a silver medal in the 4x100 meter relay alongside Francisco Santiago, Alberto Palomo and Dionibel Rodríguez Rodríguez.

Expósito has won the Spanish national championships in his classification.  He competed in the 2012 Spanish national championships held in San Javier. In 2012, he was a recipient of a Plan ADOP €23,000 athlete scholarship with a €3,000 reserve and a €2,500 coaching scholarship. He competed in the 2013 World Athletics Championships for people with intellectual disabilities hosted by the Czech Republic.  He picked up a gold medal at the event in the long jump.  He injured himself after his final jump. In July 2013, he participated in the 2013 IPC Athletics World Championships.

Paralympics 
Expósito was part of the Spanish team at the 2000 Summer Paralympics. He competed in the javelin and shot put but it was in the 100m and long jump where he won gold medals. Following a cheating scandal at the Sydney games, events for athletes with intellectual disability were excluded from the Paralympic program. They were reinstated at the 2012 Summer Paralympics where, as in 2000, Jose Antonio won a gold medal in the T20 Long Jump event.

References

External links 
 
 

1978 births
Living people
Spanish disability athletes
Paralympic athletes of Spain
Paralympic gold medalists for Spain
Athletes (track and field) at the 2000 Summer Paralympics
Athletes (track and field) at the 2012 Summer Paralympics
Medalists at the 2000 Summer Paralympics
Medalists at the 2012 Summer Paralympics
World record holders in Paralympic athletics
People from Águilas
Plan ADOP alumni
Paralympic medalists in athletics (track and field)
Spanish male sprinters
Spanish male long jumpers
Sportspeople from the Region of Murcia